Iryna Uladzimirauna Pamialova (born 5 April 1990 in Zhodzina) is a Belarusian canoer. She won a bronze medal at the 2012 Summer Olympics in the K-4 500 metres event with Nadzeya Papok-Liapeshka, Volha Khudzenka, and Maryna Litvinchuk.

References

1990 births
Belarusian female canoeists
Living people
Canoeists at the 2012 Summer Olympics
Olympic canoeists of Belarus
Olympic bronze medalists for Belarus
Olympic medalists in canoeing
ICF Canoe Sprint World Championships medalists in kayak
Medalists at the 2012 Summer Olympics
People from Zhodzina
Sportspeople from Minsk Region
21st-century Belarusian women